Neville Sydney Roper (born March 5, 1922) is a Canadian former provincial politician from Alberta. He served as a member of the Legislative Assembly of Alberta from 1967 to 1971 sitting with the Social Credit caucus in government.

Political career
Roper served on the Rimbey, Alberta town council from 1951 to 1961, and as Mayor of Rimbey from 1961 to 1966. He ran for a seat to the Alberta Legislature as an Independent Social Credit candidate in the Ponoka electoral district in the 1963 Alberta general election. He finished a very close second place losing to incumbent Glen Johnston.

Roper ran for provincial office for the second time in the 1967 Alberta general election. He ran as the official Social Credit candidate this time and won a landslide to hold the seat for his party.

Roper ran for a second term in office in the 1971 Alberta general election but was defeated by Progressive Conservative candidate Don McCrimmon. He lost the race by 17 votes finishing second.

Personal life
Of English descent, Roper was born in Camrose, Alberta, the son of Henry Basil Sydney Roper and Amy Burchnall. He served in the Royal Canadian Air Force from 1941 to 1946 during World War II.

Roper married Edith Margaret Hawkings in 1948 and has three children. His wife died in 1999. He turned 100 in 2022.

References

External links
Legislative Assembly of Alberta Members Listing

1922 births
Living people
Alberta Social Credit Party MLAs
People from Camrose, Alberta
Canadian centenarians
Men centenarians